The Mậu line (Hán tự: 支戊; chi can also be translated to as branch) was the thirteenth dynasty of Hùng kings of the Hồng Bàng period of Văn Lang (now Viet Nam). Starting approximately 968 B.C., the line refers to the rule of Tuấn Lang and his successors.

History
Tuấn Lang was born approximately 990 B.C., and took the regnal name of Hùng Việt Vương(雄越王) upon becoming Hùng king. The series of all Hùng kings following Tuấn Lang took that same regnal name of Hùng Việt Vương to rule over Văn Lang until approximately 854 B.C.

References

Bibliography
Nguyễn Khắc Thuần (2008). Thế thứ các triều vua Việt Nam. Giáo Dục Publisher.

Hồng Bàng dynasty
9th-century BC disestablishments in Vietnam
10th-century BC establishments